Our Master's Voice: Advertising is a 1934 book of social criticism about the propaganda purpose of advertising under capitalism. Author James Rorty drew on his experience as an ad copywriter in New York to write his critique. Rorty pointed out the frequent application of the then-new fields of psychology and social science for advertising research.

Reception
Critics praised Rorty's "fiery discussion of the advertising racket" and his work to debunk the mysteries of the ad profession. They criticized, however, both his narrow perspective on the industry and his lack of positive proposals for improving United States society.

References

Further reading

External links
Full text

1934 non-fiction books
Books about propaganda
Books about capitalism
Books about the media